Vadim Ivanovich Pavlenko (31 January 1955 – 6 October 2000) was a Russian professional footballer.

Club career
He made his professional debut in the Soviet Top League in 1974 for FC Dynamo Moscow.

Honours
 Soviet Top League champion: 1976 (spring).

European club competitions
With FC Dynamo Moscow.

 UEFA Cup 1974–75: 4 games, 1 goal.
 UEFA Cup 1976–77: 1 game.
 European Cup Winners' Cup 1979–80: 2 games.

References

1955 births
Footballers from Moscow
2000 deaths
Soviet footballers
Soviet Top League players
FC Dynamo Moscow players
FC Spartak Moscow players
FC Akhmat Grozny players
FC Dnipro players
Association football forwards
FC Spartak Kostroma players